The capybara is a giant cavy rodent native to South America.

Capybara may also refer to:

 Capybara (software), a web-based test automation software
 Capybara Games, a Canadian independent game studio
 "Capybara" (Sons of Anarchy), an episode of American television drama series Sons of Anarchy